SOCAP may refer to:

 SOCAP International or Society of Consumer Affairs Professionals in Business, a trade organization 
 Serious Organised Crime and Police Act 2005, a law in the United Kingdom